WKLO 96.9 FM is a radio station broadcasting a country music format. Licensed to Hardinsburg, Indiana, the station serves the Paoli, Indiana area, and is owned by Diamond Shores Broadcasting. The callsign is evocative of WKLO (AM), an influential Louisville Top 40 station that used the callsign from 1948 to 1986.

References

External links
 WKLO's official website
 

KLO
Country radio stations in the United States